Born Again Revisited is the fourth album by Columbus-based trio Times New Viking, and their second release for Matador Records. "No Time, No Hope" was released as a teaser download by Matador in advance of the album's release.

Track listing
 "Martin Luther King Day" – 2:44
 "I Smell Bubblegum" – 1:35
 "City on Drugs" – 1:51
 "Born Again Revisited" – 1:56
 "Little World" – 1:36
 "No Time, No Hope" – 2:51
 "Half Day in Hell" – 1:24
 "Something More" – 1:44
 "2/11 Don't Forget" – 3:47
 "These Days" – 2:35
 "(No) Sympathy" – 1:50
 "High Holidays" – 1:19
 "Hustler, Psycho, Son" – 2:24
 "Move to California" – 2:42
 "Take the Piss" – 0:37

References

2009 albums
Times New Viking albums
Matador Records albums